Muzzle may refer to:

 Muzzle (anatomy) or snout, the projecting parts of the face (including the nose and mouth) of an animal
 Muzzle (mouth guard), a device that covers an animal's snout
 Muzzle (firearms), the mouth of a firearm
 Muzzle (band), a band based in Seattle, Washington, U.S.
 "Muzzle" (song), a song by the Smashing Pumpkins from Mellon Collie and the Infinite Sadness
 Muzzle, a character in Road Rovers
 Muzzle (film), an upcoming film starring Aaron Eckhart

See also
 Flash suppressor
 Muzzle booster
 Muzzle brake
 "Muzzle #1", a song by The Whip
 Muzzle law (disambiguation)
 Muzzle shroud